Atluri Sriman Narayana is an Indian dental surgeon, a former Professor of Dental Surgery in Government Dental College, Hyderabad and a former State Coordinator of the Andhra Pradesh School Health Services known for the free dental camps he has conducted across the villages in Andhra Pradesh since 1974. He founded the Sai Oral Health Foundation, under the aegis of which he makes weekly trips to the rural areas of the state, conducts medical camps and delivers lectures at schools educating the rural masses about oral hygiene. His efforts are reported to have reached 1.5 million children in 20,000 schools.

Narayana received the B. C. Roy Award, the highest medical award of the Government of India in 1989. He is also a recipient of the Visishta Puraskara from the Government of Andhra Pradesh (1999), Dr. Paidi Lakshmaiah Puraskar from Dr. Paidi Laxmaiah Trust, TANA Excellency Award (2009) and the FAMDENT Lifetime Achievement Award (2010). He was honored again by the Government of India, in 2002, with the fourth highest Indian civilian award of Padma Shri.

Personal life 
Narayana is married to Srirama Laskhmi in Hyderabad, India. His oldest son, Sairam Atluri, is the CEO of Stemcures, and is a pain physician practicing in Cincinnati, OH. His younger son, Mohan Atluri, is a maxillofacial surgeon practicing in Hyderabad. He has three grandchildren, Trisha Atluri, Teja Atluri, and Master Neel Sai Atluri.

References

Recipients of the Padma Shri in medicine
Indian surgeons
Indian dentists
Social workers
Dr. B. C. Roy Award winners
20th-century Indian medical doctors
Medical doctors from Andhra Pradesh
Social workers from Andhra Pradesh
20th-century surgeons